Union of Arab Republics refers
mostly to Federation of Arab Republics (a confederation of Egypt and Syria with Libya, 1971/72-1977)
more rarely to the proposal for a new United Arab Republic (Egypt and Syria with Iraq, 1972)